The 1950 South Sydney season was the 43rd in the club's history. The club competed in the New South Wales Rugby Football League Premiership (NSWRFL), finishing the season as premiers and minor premiers.

Ladder

Fixtures

Regular season

Finals

References

South Sydney Rabbitohs seasons
1950 in Australian rugby league